Ulaş Zengin (born 25 June 1997) is a Turkish professional footballer who plays as a centre-back for Turkish club Karacabey Belediyespor on loan from Gaziantep.

Career
Zengin is a product of Altay's youth academy since 2007. He joined their senior team and signed his first professional contract in 2014. On 22 May 2019, he transferred to Gaziantep. He made his professional debut with Gaziantep in a 5–4 Süper Lig loss to Çaykur Rizespor on 11 May 2021.

References

External links

1997 births
Living people
People from Bornova
Turkish footballers
Association football defenders
Altay S.K. footballers
Gaziantep F.K. footballers
Adanaspor footballers
Karacabey Belediyespor footballers
Süper Lig players
TFF First League players
TFF Second League players
TFF Third League players